Firas Tariq Nasser Al-Buraikan (born 14 May 2000) is a Saudi Arabian professional footballer who plays as a striker for Pro League side Al-Fateh.

International career

Al-Buraikan was first summoned for the U-20 national team in Saudi Arabia's successful 2018 AFC U-19 Championship conquest, scoring one goal in Saudi Arabia's 3–1 win over Australia. Although scoring just one, his successful display in the tournament allowed him to be summoned for the Saudi squad in the 2019 FIFA U-20 World Cup, where he had a successful performance with two goals against Mali and Panama; however, his successful performance didn't transcend to the team as the under-20 Asian champions crumbled from the group stage with a humiliating three straight defeats. He carried the same successes to the under-23 team in the 2020 AFC U-23 Championship and 2022 AFC U-23 Asian Cup, as the Saudis reached the final twice, winning the latter for the first time; the good form in 2020 event allowed him to become part of the Saudi Olympic side in the 2020 Summer Olympics, though this time, he failed to score as Saudi Arabia once again crumbled at the group stage with three straight defeats.

Nonetheless, his good form at the under-20 allowed him to be summoned for the senior side in 2019 for the 2022 FIFA World Cup qualification – AFC Second Round against Singapore. He scored his first international goal against Kuwait in the 24th Arabian Gulf Cup as Saudi Arabia lost 3–1. He went on to play an instrumental role, scoring three goals in the third round as Saudi Arabia impressed by topping the qualifiers. He then took part in the 2022 FIFA World Cup of the squad, and greatly impressed with an assist in Saudi Arabia's historic 2–1 win over Argentina in what would be the greatest upset in World Cup history. However, the assist turned to be Al-Buraikan's only impression, as his inability to score saw Saudi Arabia condemned to bottom place after losing to Poland and Mexico.

International goals
As of 27 January 2022.

Scores and results list Saudi Arabia's goal tally first.

Honours

Club
Al-Nassr
 Saudi Professional League: 2018–19
Saudi Super Cup: 2019, 2020

International
Saudi Arabia U-20
 AFC U-19 Championship: 2018
Saudi Arabia U23
AFC U-23 Asian Cup: 2022

Individual
 Saudi Professional League Young Player of the Month: February 2022

References

External links

2000 births
Living people
Sportspeople from Riyadh
Saudi Arabian footballers
Saudi Arabia youth international footballers
Saudi Arabia international footballers
Association football forwards
Al Nassr FC players
Al-Fateh SC players
Saudi Professional League players
Olympic footballers of Saudi Arabia
Footballers at the 2020 Summer Olympics
2022 FIFA World Cup players